Gianluigi Jessi (born 7 July 1945) is a retired Italian basketball player. He was part of the Italian team that finished eighth at the 1968 Summer Olympics.

References

1945 births
Living people
Italian men's basketball players
1967 FIBA World Championship players
Olympic basketball players of Italy
Basketball players at the 1968 Summer Olympics